Matthew Chan Wah Hei (11 August 1947 – 24 November 2016) was a Hong Kong épée, foil and sabre fencer. He competed at the 1972 and 1976 Summer Olympics. On 24 November 2016, Chan died from cancer.

References

External links
 

1947 births
2016 deaths
Hong Kong male épée fencers
Olympic fencers of Hong Kong
Fencers at the 1972 Summer Olympics
Fencers at the 1976 Summer Olympics
Fencers at the 1974 Asian Games
Fencers at the 1978 Asian Games
Asian Games competitors for Hong Kong
Hong Kong male foil fencers
Hong Kong male sabre fencers
20th-century Hong Kong people